Song Suk-Woo (Hangul: 송석우, Hanja: 宋錫雨, born March 1, 1983) is a South Korean short track speed skater who won gold in the 5000m relay at the 2006 Winter Olympics in Turin.

References

External links
Song Suk-woo at the ISU

1983 births
Living people
South Korean male short track speed skaters
Olympic short track speed skaters of South Korea
Olympic medalists in short track speed skating
Olympic gold medalists for South Korea
Short track speed skaters at the 2006 Winter Olympics
Medalists at the 2006 Winter Olympics
Asian Games medalists in short track speed skating
Asian Games gold medalists for South Korea
Asian Games bronze medalists for South Korea
Short track speed skaters at the 2003 Asian Winter Games
Medalists at the 2003 Asian Winter Games
Universiade medalists in short track speed skating
World Short Track Speed Skating Championships medalists
Dankook University alumni
Universiade gold medalists for South Korea
Competitors at the 2005 Winter Universiade
South Korean Buddhists
21st-century South Korean people